Belsentes is a commune in the Ardèche department in southern France. The municipality was established on 1 January 2019 by merger of the former communes of Nonières and Saint-Julien-Labrousse.

See also
Communes of the Ardèche department

References

Communes of Ardèche
Communes nouvelles of Ardèche
Populated places established in 2019
2019 establishments in France